The Virgin of Almudena (Virgen de la Almudena) is  a medieval statue of the Virgin Mary, mother of Jesus Christ. The image is regarded as a patroness of Madrid, Spain.

The Cathedral of Madrid is dedicated to this title of the Virgin, and her feast day, 9 November, is a major holiday in Madrid. There are replicas that are used in processions, as well as more recent versions of the statue at various places.

The original statue has been lost to history though. The present one dates to the 16th. Art historians attribute the statue now in the cathedral to the Netherlandish sculptor, Diego Copín de Holanda, who worked in Spain, around 1500. Its name derives from the Arabic term of Al Mudayna, or the citadel.

Before the victory parade celebrating their performance in the 2022 World Cup, Real Madrid presented the Champions trophy before the statue in the cathedral.

Legends
There are various legends regarding the icon. The legend has it that the statue was brought from the Holy Land in the year 38 by James (Santiago), the apostle and brother of Jesus, and like all relics, deemed holy and was considered to have supernatural properties.

One story is that in 712, prior to the capture of the town by advancing Muslim forces, the inhabitants of the town sealed the image of the Virgin inside the walls surrounding the town for its own protection.In the 11th century, when Madrid was reconquered by King Alfonso VI of Castile, the Christian soldiers endeavored to find the statue. After days of prayer, the spot on the wall hiding the icon crumbled, revealing the statue. 

Another legend is that as Christian soldiers approached the town, they had a vision of Mary imploring them to allow her to lead them into the city. Again, the miraculous crumbling of the wall occurred, with the icon showing an entry route through the walls.

References

External links

Almudena
Marian apparitions
Catholic devotions
Titles of Mary
Catholic Mariology
Almudena
Almudena
Religion in Madrid